Lawrence Thomas Guy (born March 17, 1990) is an American football defensive end for the New England Patriots of the National Football League (NFL). Prior to being drafted by the Green Bay Packers, he played college football at Arizona State. He has also played with the Indianapolis Colts, Baltimore Ravens, and San Diego Chargers.

Early years
As a child, Guy was placed in special education classes, as he had been diagnosed with attention deficit hyperactivity disorder, dyslexia, and dyscalculia.

Guy attended Western High School in Las Vegas, Nevada, where he recorded 238 tackles (171 solo), 30.5 sacks and three fumble recoveries in his three seasons. As a senior in 2007, he totaled 102 tackles (69 solo), 15.5 quarterback sacks and one fumble recovery.

Considered a four-star recruit by Rivals.com, Guy was listed as the No. 13 defensive tackle prospect in the nation. He committed to the Sun Devils on December 19, 2007, choosing ASU over Arizona, Michigan, Nebraska, Oklahoma, Oregon, and Tennessee.

College career
As a true freshman, Guy played in all 12 games of the season, starting the final eight. He totaled 44 tackles (17 solo), 10.0 tackles for loss (for –22 yards), two sacks (for –9 yards) and one fumble recovery that he returned for a touchdown. Guy's 44 tackles were the second-highest among Pac-10 defensive tackles on the season.

Guy subsequently earned consensus All-Freshman honors, as he was named to FWAA′s Freshman All-America team, The Sporting News′ All-Freshman team, and College Football News′ All-Freshman first-team.

Professional career

Green Bay Packers

Guy was drafted in the seventh round (233rd overall) of the 2011 NFL Draft by the Green Bay Packers. He spent the season on injured reserve. Guy was one of the final cuts of the 2012 season, but he was re-signed to the practice squad on September 3, 2012.

Indianapolis Colts
On October 17, 2012, the Colts signed Guy from the Packers' practice squad. In 9 games with the Colts, he recorded 21 tackles (15 solo) and 1 sack.

San Diego Chargers
On October 8, 2013, Guy was claimed off waivers by the San Diego Chargers. Guy appeared in 10 games for the Chargers in 2013 where he had 16 tackles. In 2014 Guy appeared in just 3 games before being waived by the team.

Baltimore Ravens
On September 24, 2014, Guy was claimed off waivers by the Baltimore Ravens after spending the first 3 weeks of the regular season with the Chargers.

On October 11, 2015, in a home game against the Cleveland Browns Guy recorded two sacks on quarterback Josh McCown.

Guy finished the 2015 season with 46 tackles and 4.5 sacks.

During the 2016 season Guy recorded 28 tackles, 1 sack and 1 forced fumble.

New England Patriots

2017 season
On March 11, 2017, Guy signed a four-year, $20 million contract with the New England Patriots. In Guy’s first season with the Patriots, he recorded 58 tackles and 1 sack. In the Divisional Round of the playoffs, Guy recorded 2 tackles in the victory over the Tennessee Titans. In the AFC Championship Game against the Jacksonville Jaguars, Guy had 6 tackles and 1 sack to help the Patriots reach the Super Bowl. In Super Bowl LII, Guy recorded 6 tackles, but the Patriots lost 41-33 to the Philadelphia Eagles.

2018 season
Throughout the season, Guy appeared in all 16 games starting 15 of them. He recorded 59 tackles, 1 sack and 1 forced fumble. Guy helped the Patriots reach Super Bowl LIII where they defeated the Los Angeles Rams 13-3.

2019 season
During Week 8, Guy recorded his first career interception off of a botched shovel pass by Cleveland Browns quarterback Baker Mayfield in the 27–13 win.
In week 9 against the Baltimore Ravens Guy recovered a fumble forced by teammate Kyle Van Noy on running back Mark Ingram II in the 37–20 loss.
In week 11 against the Philadelphia Eagles, Guy recovered a fumble forced by teammate Danny Shelton on Carson Wentz in the 17–10 win.

2020 season
In Week 7 against the San Francisco 49ers, Guy recorded his first sack of the season on former teammate Jimmy Garoppolo during the 33–6 loss.

2021 season
On March 30, 2021, Guy signed a four-year, $11.5 million contract extension with the Patriots. He started all 17 games, recording 60 tackles and 1.5 sacks.

2022 season
Guy returned as a starting defensive tackle in 2022. He started 14 games, recording 46 tackles and two sacks.

Charity work
In 2022, Guy was New England's nominee for the Walter Payton NFL Man of the Year Award. He and his wife operate the Lawrence Guy Family Foundation.

References

External links

CBS Sports profile 
Green Bay Packers bio 
Indianapolis Colts bio 
Rivals.com Scouting Reports 
San Diego Chargers bio 
Baltimore Ravens mini bio 

1990 births
Living people
American football defensive ends
American football defensive tackles
Arizona State Sun Devils football players
Baltimore Ravens players
Green Bay Packers players
Indianapolis Colts players
New England Patriots players
Players of American football from Nevada
San Diego Chargers players
Sportspeople from Las Vegas
Western High School (Nevada) alumni